The 2019 Tour de Romandie was a road cycling stage race, that took place between 30 April and 5 May 2019 in Switzerland. It was the 73rd edition of the Tour de Romandie and the 21st race of the 2019 UCI World Tour.

Teams
In total, twenty teams start the race. Each team delivered seven riders.

Route

Stages

Prologue
30 April 2019 — Neuchâtel, individual time trial (ITT)

Stage 1
1 May 2019 — Neuchâtel to La Chaux-de-Fonds,

Stage 2
2 May 2019 — Le Locle to Morges,

Stage 3
3 May 2019 — Romont to Romont,

Stage 4
4 May 2019 — Lucens to Torgon,

Stage 5
5 May 2019 — Genève to Genève, individual time trial (ITT)
{|
|-
||

Classification leadership table

Final classification standings

General classification

Points classification

Mountains classification

Young rider classification

Teams classification

References

2019
2019 UCI World Tour
2019 in Swiss sport
April 2019 sports events in Switzerland
May 2019 sports events in Switzerland